Stephen Andrew Seymour (October 4, 1920, in New York City – June 18, 1973, in Los Angeles) was an American track and field athlete who competed in the javelin throw; he is regarded by track and field historians as America's original javelin technician.

Following the Second World War, performance levels of elite U.S. javelin throwers lagged well behind the Europeans. Seeking to refine his skills, Seymour spent 1946 in Finland, training with that nation's world-class throwers. It did not take long for his meticulous research to pay dividends. In 1947, he established an American record of 75.80 meters (248' 8") at the U.S. AAU Championships; his mark was within ten feet of the global standard set by Finland's Yrjö Nikkanen in 1938.

1948 was a memorable year in Seymour's career; he won a second consecutive national AAU title, and a silver medal at the Summer Olympics in London. In 1950, Seymour added a third national championship to his collection; and in 1951 he was the silver medalist at the Pan American Games.

References

External links
United States Track and Field
United States Olympic Committee

1920 births
1973 deaths
American male javelin throwers
Jewish American sportspeople
Athletes (track and field) at the 1948 Summer Olympics
Athletes (track and field) at the 1951 Pan American Games
Olympic silver medalists for the United States in track and field
Track and field athletes from California
Medalists at the 1948 Summer Olympics
Pan American Games silver medalists for the United States
Pan American Games medalists in athletics (track and field)
Medalists at the 1951 Pan American Games
20th-century American Jews